The Vishisht Seva Medal (VSM) is a decoration of the Indian Armed Forces. It is awarded to recognize "distinguished service of a high order" to all ranks of the Indian Armed Forces.

From 1980, the Yudh Seva Medal was introduced to recognize exceptional services in an operational environment. Since then the VSM has been restricted to non-operational service.

History
The Vishisht Seva Medal was originally instituted as the "Vishisht Seva Medal, Class III" on 26 January 1960. Five other medals were instituted on the same day - the Sainya Seva Medal, Sena Medal, Nao Sena Medal and the Vayu Sena Medal. It was renamed on January 27, 1961, and the badge signed.

Eligibility
The award may be granted posthumously and subsequent awards are represented by a bar worn on the ribbon. The award carries with it the right to use "VSM" as post-nominal letters. The medal was originally established as the "Vishisht Seva Medal, Class III". It was renamed to its present name on 27 January 1967. The design of the medal remained unchanged and the change be reflected only in the records.

Medal
The medal is a 35-mm circular medal, with a five-pointed star in the centre. It is suspended from a straight-bar suspender with the name on the edge. The state emblem with the name of the decoration in Hindi above - "Vishisht Seva Medal" in Hindi. The ribbon is 32 mm long in yellow, with three 2 mm dark blue stripes dividing it into four equal parts

See also
 Yudh Seva Medal - the war-time equivalent

References

Further reading 
Indian Air Force: Vishist Seva Medal & Yudh Seva MedalBharat-rakshak.com awards databasePages: 1 to 24, Page 8: Vishist Seva Medal, Cpl V V Audipudi 244047 or Unit: N.A., Award date: 26 January 1978, Announced: 26 January 1978, Details: Citation not available, Reference:  N.A.

Military awards and decorations of India
Indian Air Force
Recipients of the Vishisht Seva Medal
Awards established in 1960
1960 establishments in India